Matt Luff (born May 5, 1997) is a Canadian professional ice hockey winger for the Grand Rapids Griffins of the American Hockey League (AHL) while under contract to the Detroit Red Wings of the National Hockey League (NHL).

Playing career
Coming off a successful season with the Oakville Rangers Midget AAA, Luff split his time between the Rangers and the Oakville Blades of the Ontario Junior Hockey League for the 2013–14 season. On June 9, 2014, Luff signed a contract with the Blades for the 2014–15 season, however he chose to commit to the Belleville Bulls of the Ontario Hockey League who had drafted him in the OHL Draft. In his rookie year with the Bulls, Luff was named a finalist for the Rookie of the Year, with the award eventually going to Alex DeBrincat. Following the 2014–15 season, the Bulls were renamed the Hamilton Bulldogs.

After going undrafted in the NHL Entry Draft, Luff attended the Los Angeles Kings development and training camp as a free agent. He eventually signed a three-year entry level contract with the Kings on September 23, 2016, becoming the first Bulldog to sign an NHL contract. Luff returned to the OHL for the 2016–17 season where he played only 45 games due to a shoulder injury and concussion. Despite his shortened season, Luff was reassigned to the Kings American Hockey League (AHL) affiliate, the Ontario Reign on  April 7, 2017.

Luff began the 2018–19 season with the Ontario Reign after being assigned there from the Kings training camp. Luff was recalled to the NHL on November 3, 2018, and he made his NHL debut that night against the Columbus Blue Jackets. Luff played 9:43 in his debut to help the Kings win 4–1 over the Blue Jackets. After playing in three games, Luff was reassigned to the Ontario Reign on November 11 only to be recalled three days later on November 14. Luff recorded his first career NHL goal in a 2–0 win over the St. Louis Blues on November 19. On November 25, in a 5–2 win over the Edmonton Oilers, Luff recorded his fourth goal in the same number of games, becoming the fifth Kings rookie to do so since Jimmy Carson in 1987. His streak ended the following game against the Vancouver Canucks.

After appearing in 30 games for the Kings, and recording 10 points, Luff was reassigned to the Ontario Reign on February 8, 2019.

Luff played for five years within the Los Angeles Kings organization before leaving as a free agent following the  season. He was signed to a one-year, two-way contract with the Nashville Predators on July 28, 2021.

On July 13, 2022, Luff signed a one-year, two-way contract with the Detroit Red Wings.

Career statistics

References

External links
 

1997 births
Living people
Belleville Bulls players
Canadian ice hockey right wingers
Detroit Red Wings players
Grand Rapids Griffins players
Hamilton Bulldogs (OHL) players
Los Angeles Kings players
Milwaukee Admirals players
Nashville Predators players
Ontario Reign (AHL) players
Undrafted National Hockey League players